"Dust to Dust" is a song recorded by American folk band the Civil Wars, from their self-titled fifth studio album in 2013. Written by Joy Williams and John Paul White. The song was released on October 7, 2013 by Columbia Records as the album's third single.

A music video accompanying the single was released on October 3, 2013, the video features footages from their 2011 Paris trip.

Music video

Development 
"When we re-discovered what we'd once thought to be lost footage from two years ago, these forgotten images from a trip to Paris strangely seemed fitting for the feel of "Dust To Dust." For me, it's like stepping back in time. Hope you can also enjoy these simple moments captured in one of the world's most beautiful cities." - Joy Williams

Release history

Chart performance

References 

2013 singles
Columbia Records singles
2013 songs
Songs written by Joy Williams (singer)
Songs written by John Paul White
The Civil Wars songs